The 1901 Oswestry by-election was held on 24 May 1901 following the death of the incumbent Conservative MP, Stanley Leighton on 4 May 1901.

The seat was retained by the Conservative candidate George Ormsby-Gore.

References

1901 elections in the United Kingdom
1901 in England
20th century in Shropshire
By-elections to the Parliament of the United Kingdom in Shropshire constituencies
Oswestry